Peter Emil Thomas Mathieson (né Schwartz; 1 December 1914 – 12 October 1986) was a New Zealand swimmer who won a bronze medal representing his country at the 1950 British Empire Games.

At the 1950 British Empire Games he won the bronze medal as part of the men's 330 yards medley relay. His teammates for the relay were Lyall Barry and John Shanahan. He also competed in the men's 100 yards backstroke where he placed 4th.

See also
 List of Commonwealth Games medallists in swimming (men)

References

1914 births
1986 deaths
Sportspeople from New Plymouth
Commonwealth Games bronze medallists for New Zealand
New Zealand male backstroke swimmers
Swimmers at the 1950 British Empire Games
Commonwealth Games medallists in swimming
20th-century New Zealand people
Medallists at the 1950 British Empire Games